Malpaso may refer to:

 Malpaso Creek, Monterey County, California, USA
 Malpaso Dam, Mexico, officially known as the Nezahualcóyotl Dam
 Malpaso Productions, Clint Eastwood's production company
 Pico de Malpaso, the highest point on El Hierro, Canary Islands
 The song "Malpaso Man" by the British band Visage